The 2018–19 Northwestern State Demons basketball team represented Northwestern State University during the 2018–19 NCAA Division I men's basketball season. The Demons, led by 20th-year head coach Mike McConathy, played their home games at Prather Coliseum in Natchitoches, Louisiana as members of the Southland Conference. They finished the season 11–20 overall, 6–12 in Southland play to finish in 11th place. Since only the top eight teams are eligible for the Southland tournament, Northwestern State failed to qualify this season.

Previous season
The Demons finished 2017–18 the season 4–25, 1–17 in Southland play to finish in last place. They failed to qualify for the Southland tournament.

Roster

Schedule and results
Sources:

|-
!colspan=9 style=| Non-conference regular season

|-
!colspan=9 colspan=9 style=| Southland regular season

See also
2018–19 Northwestern State Lady Demons basketball team

References

Northwestern State
Northwestern State Demons basketball seasons
Northwestern State Demons basketball
Northwestern State Demons basketball